Yoot may refer to:

 Yoot Saito (born 1962), Japanese computer game program designer
 Yut, a traditional board game played in Korea, sometimes romanized as 'yoot'

See also
Ute (disambiguation)